The County of Forty Mile No. 8 is a municipal district in south eastern Alberta, Canada. It is located in Census Division 1, southwest of Medicine Hat. Its municipal office is located in the Village of Foremost.

Geography

Communities and localities 
The following urban municipalities are surrounded by the County of Forty Mile No. 8.
Cities
none
Towns
Bow Island
Villages
Foremost
Summer villages
none

The following hamlets are located within the County of Forty Mile No. 8.
Hamlets
Burdett (dissolved from village status on January 1, 2003)
Etzikom
Manyberries
Orion
Skiff

The following localities are located within the County of Forty Mile No. 8.
Localities 

Aden
Avalon
Bingen
Birdsholm
Comrey
Endon
Faith
Florann
Gahern
Goddard
Granlea
Groton
Hoping

Inversnay
Jensen
Juno
Legend
Maleb (previously Conquerville)
Nemiscam
Pakowki
Pendant d'Oreille
Pinhorn
Ranchville
Whitla
Winnifred

Other places
Altorado

Demographics 

In the 2016 Census of Population conducted by Statistics Canada, the County of Forty Mile No. 8 had a population of 3,581 living in 865 of its 968 total private dwellings, a  change from its 2011 population of 3,336.

See also 
List of communities in Alberta
List of municipal districts in Alberta

References

External links 

 
Forty Mile
1954 establishments in Alberta